Enchanted Tale of Beauty and the Beast (Japanese: 美女と野獣 “魔法のものがたり”) is a trackless dark ride at Tokyo Disneyland based on Disney's Beauty and the Beast (1991). It opened on September 28, 2020.

Summary
Guests board enchanted serving dishes that dance in rhythm to the film's well-known music and follow Belle on a romantic musical adventure inside the enchanted castle where she dances her way into the heart of the Beast, just in time to break the fateful spell.

History
On October 14, 2016, The Oriental Land Company (OLC) announced they would close Grand Circuit Raceway and open "Beauty and the Beast" theme area with a budget of 32 billion yen.
The construction started on April 5, 2017. It was scheduled to open Spring 2020, however it got delayed due to COVID-19 pandemic in Japan and opened on September 28, 2020.

The Imagineering, OLC and contractor teams that built the attraction completed the project on time and turned it over to OLC Operations in March of 2020, ahead of the planned opening, despite having to deal with the uncertainties of the COVID-19 pandemic.  Many of the Imagineers were away from their families during this difficult time.

Exterior
Enchanted Tale of Beauty and the Beast is the most technologically advanced, as well as one of the most immersive and detailed attractions, at Tokyo Disney Resort.  To make this original attraction a reality, the Imagineers created a 108-foot-tall castle, complete with over 100 pieces of architectural ornamentation, which serves as the entrance to a 7,309 square meter dark ride.

Technology
This attraction is a true E-ticket in the classic sense.  It’s not a thrill ride, there are no health restrictions and there is no height requirement.   Keeping up the tradition of Pirates of the Caribbean and the Haunted Mansion, it is an immersive experience which sets new standards for its time.  Enchanted Tale of Beauty and the Beast features 35 electric Audio-Animatronics figures and a trackless ride system that includes both a transport base and an on-board motion base that simulates a wide variety of dance moves.  The climax of the attraction uses a Pepper’s Ghost illusion that includes projection mapping on an animated figure that moves on the end of an invisible robotic arm through three-dimensional space while spinning 360 degrees.  All of this technology exists to serve the guest experience which is artistically crafted to bring the guests on an emotional journey.  

The attraction features yet another first for Tokyo Disney Resort; the figures were animated to the Japanese dialogue from the very beginning—complete with Japanese gestures and posture. Walt Disney Imagineering show writer Charlie Watanabe coached the American animators on how to make their performances play better to the target audience.

Layout
The ride-through portion of the attraction is seven and a half minutes long. There is also a three-minute preshow and a couple of two-minute show scenes after the preshow.  All together the entire experience is almost 15-minutes long, and that does not include the immersive queue.

Music
The musical score is emotionally linked to every aspect of the experience; all the vehicle movement, animation, practical effects, projection and lighting are synchronized to the music.  In many ways this represents the culmination of the work Walt Disney began when he first synchronized music to animation in 1928 and then created an entire feature film based on the idea of synchronizing animation to music, Fantasia.  The joy that comes from watching music and movement performed as one artistic expression is taken to another level; the guests themselves are inside a vehicle that is a part of the show--dancing along with all their fellow animated characters. Just as Audio-Animatronics animation grew out of film animation, the Enchanted Tale of Beauty and the Beast was inspired by the Disney tradition of animating to music.  The academy award winning score by Alan Menken has been arranged to become one continuous piece of music that begins when the ride vehicles are first dispatched and ends just as the vehicles park at the unload platform—as if the music has been magically animating the vehicles the whole time.

Critical Response
Due to the COVID-19 pandemic in Japan the attraction opened without the usual publicity as travel was severely limited.  Despite this, the critical response among those who were able to experience the attraction has been extraordinarily positive.

References

External links
 Official site

 OLC/Disney Preview Publicity Video

 OLC Opening Publicity Video 1

 OLC Opening Publicity Video 2

 ReviewTyme Attraction Review

 WDWNT Attraction Review

Beauty and the Beast (franchise)
Tokyo Disneyland
Fantasyland
Walt Disney Parks and Resorts attractions
Audio-Animatronic attractions